The Archbishop of Tuam is an archbishop which takes its name after the town of Tuam in County Galway, Ireland. The title was used by the Church of Ireland until 1839, and is still in use by the Catholic Church.

History
At the Synod of Rathbreasail in 1111, Tuam was named as the seat of a diocese corresponding roughly with the diocese of Elphin, whilst Cong was chosen as the seat of a diocese corresponding with the later archdiocese of Tuam in west Connacht. There is no record of any bishops of Cong, and no bishop was given the title "bishop of Tuam" in the Irish annals before 1152. However the annals recorded some "archbishops/bishops of Connacht" such as Cathasach Ua Conaill (died 1117), Domhnall Ua Dubhthaigh (1117–1136), Muireadhach Ua Dubhthaigh (1136–1150) – the latter was succeeded by Áed Ua hOissín. At the Synod of Kells in 1152, the archdiocese of Tuam was established with six suffragan dioceses.

During the Reformation, the bishopric of Annaghdown was annexed to Tuam in c. 1555. After the Reformation, there were parallel apostolic successions: one of the Church of Ireland and the other of the Catholic Church.

 In the Church of Ireland

In 1569, the Church of Ireland bishopric of Mayo was annexed to the archbishopric. Between the seventeenth and nineteenth centuries, a number of other bishoprics were also united to the archbishopric. The bishopric of Kilfenora was united to Tuam from 1661 to 1742, Ardagh from 1742 to 1839, and Killala and Achonry from 1834.

On the death of Archbishop Le Poer Trench in 1839, the Ecclesiastical Province of Tuam lost its metropolitan status and became the united bishopric of Tuam, Killala and Achonry in the Province of Armagh.

 In the Catholic Church

After an unsettled period in the mid to late sixteenth century, the Catholic archbishopric has had a consistent succession of archbishops. In 1631, the Catholic bishopric of Mayo was formally joined to Tuam by papal decree.

The current archbishop is the Most Reverend Francis Duffy who was announced as the new archbishop of Tuam by the Holy See on 10 November 2021 and subsequently installed on 9 January 2022. The archbishop's residence is the Archbishop's House, Tuam, County Galway, Ireland.

Pre-Reformation archbishops

Archbishops during the Reformation

Post-Reformation archbishops

Church of Ireland succession

Catholic succession

References

Bibliography

External links
Archdiocese of Tuam by GCatholic.org
Catholic-Hierarchy.org – Diocese Profile
Profile from CatholicCity.com – info from Catholic Encyclopedia

 
 
 
Tuam
Tuam, archbishop
Religion in Tuam
Tuam